The United States Foreign Intelligence Surveillance Court of Review (FISCR) is a U.S. federal court whose sole purpose is to review denials of applications for electronic surveillance warrants (called FISA warrants) by the United States Foreign Intelligence Surveillance Court (or FISC). The FISCR was established by the Foreign Intelligence Surveillance Act of 1978 (known as FISA for short) and consists of a panel of three judges. Like the FISC, the FISCR is not an adversarial court; rather, the only party to the court is the federal government, although other parties may submit briefs as amici curiae if they are made aware of the proceedings. Papers are filed and proceedings are held in secret. Records of the proceedings are kept classified, though copies of the proceedings with sensitive information redacted are very occasionally made public. The government may appeal decisions of the FISCR to the Supreme Court of the United States, which hears appeals on a discretionary basis.

There is no provision for review or appeal of a grant of a warrant application, only of a denial. That is because in both the FISC and the FISCA, the governmentthe party who seeks a warrant to conduct surveillanceis the only party before the court, and it is unusual for anyone else to become aware of the warrant application in the first place.

The judges of the Court of Review are district or appellate federal judges, appointed by the Chief Justice of the United States for seven-year terms. Their terms are staggered so that there are at least two years between consecutive appointments. A judge may be appointed only once to either the FISCR or the FISC.

Notable cases

In re Sealed Case 

The FISCR was called into session for the first time in 2002 in a case referred to as In re: Sealed Case No. 02-001. The FISC had granted a FISA warrant to the Federal Bureau of Investigation (FBI) but had placed restrictions on its use; specifically, the FBI was denied the ability to use evidence gathered under the warrant in criminal cases. FISCR allowed a coalition of civil liberties groups, including the American Civil Liberties Union and the Electronic Frontier Foundation, to file amicus briefs opposing the FBI's new surveillance programs. The FISCR held that the restrictions that the FISC had placed on the warrant violated both FISA and the USA PATRIOT Act and that there was no constitutional requirement for those restrictions.

In re Directives 
In August 2008, the FISCR affirmed the constitutionality of the Protect America Act of 2007 in a heavily redacted opinion, In re Directives [redacted text] Pursuant to Section 105B of the Foreign Intelligence Surveillance Act, released on January 15, 2009. In re Directives was only the second such public ruling since FISA's enactment.

In re Certification of Questions of Law 
In May 2018, the FISCR affirmed an en banc order holding that three public interest groups had "standing to seek disclosure of the classified portions of the opinions at issue."  The three groups were the American Civil Liberties Union Foundation, the American Civil Liberties Union of the Nation's Capital, and the Media Freedom and Information Access Clinic at Yale University.  The government had argued that none of the groups had a legal right to compel disclosure of FISC opinions.  The FISCR disagreed, holding: "The flaw in the government's position is that it attacks the merits of the movants' claim rather than whether the claim is judicially cognizable. In other words, the government confuses the question of whether the movants have a First Amendment right of access to FISC opinions with the question of whether they have a right merely to assert that claim. Courts have repeatedly pointed out that there is a distinction between whether the plaintiff has shown injury for purposes of standing and whether the plaintiff can succeed on the merits."

Composition

Current membership

Former members 
Note that the start dates of service for some judges conflict among sources.

References

Further reading

External links 
 Rules of the Foreign Intelligence Surveillance Court of Review, via Federation of American Scientists
 The Department of Justice brief on Case No. 02-001, redacted version, via Federation of American Scientists
 FISCOR Hearing transcript on 02-001, via Federation of American Scientists
 The Court of Review's Decision on "In re: Sealed Case No. 02-001", from Findlaw

Foreign Intelligence Surveillance Court of Review
Review